Tami Stronach (born summer 1972) is an actor, dancer, filmmaker, and professor.

A childhood performance as the Childlike Empress in the 1984 film The NeverEnding Story led to a record deal and music video in Germany.  Inappropriate attention to the young star led her to eschew acting, and instead focused on dancing.  As an adult, she has branched into teaching, producing dance performances, filmmaking, and supporting child performers.

Personal life
Tami Stronach was born in summer 1972 in the Imperial State of Iran.  Her parents were the archaeologists David Stronach from Scotland (1931–2020) and Ruth Stronach from Israel (1937–2017).  Stronach, her sister Keren, and their parents fled the Iranian Revolution to Tel Aviv before moving to the United Kingdom and then to California in 1981 to allow David to teach at the University of California, Berkeley.

By late 2014, Stronach and her daughter Maya (born ) lived in Brooklyn; Stronach was married to Greg Steinbruner as of mid-2020.

Performance career
In addition to her artistic projects, Stronach also followed in her father's footsteps, becoming a professor in New York City.

Acting
As a child, Stronach studied musical theatre.  While portraying Piglet in a San Francisco stage adaptation of Winnie-the-Pooh, she was approached by the casting director for The NeverEnding Story and asked to audition for the role of the Childlike Empress.  After three auditions, Stronach beat Heather O'Rourke to star in the 1984 film; it has been her only major motion picture.  Ruth Stronach lived with her daughter in Bavaria for the three-month film shoot, and afterwards declined a sequel contract for her daughter, worried about lacking the wherewithal to "help her daughter navigate the turbulent waters of childhood stardom in the film industry."  After NeverEnding Story became a sensational success, the Stronachs were besieged with unwanted attention: their home and telephone were stalked, adults proposed to the eleven-year-old with engagement rings, and she received "offers from Hollywood to play roles featuring scenes (with nudity) completely inappropriate for someone her age."

Stronach returned to acting in 2002 with a physical theatre company, and by 2006 had performed in Chambre at La MaMa Experimental Theatre Club and was continuing to study acting with Laura Esterman.

Singing
During the junket for The NeverEnding Story, Stronach appeared on a German talk show and was asked how much German she had learned; after explaining she only knew the lyrics to "99 Luftballons", she agreed to sing live on TV.  The next day, a music producer offered a record deal.  With only three days left in the country, the Stronachs agreed to the contract, songs were written, and the young actress both recorded them and starred in a music video before returning to the US.  She later said of the whirlwind experience: "It was insane, [...] And then literally that was it. We didn't change the ticket."

Dancing
Switching her focus from acting to professional dancing after The NeverEnding Story, Stronach devoted herself to that study for ten years (through her twenties) in New York City.  In 1996, Stronach began dancing with Neta Pulvermacher and Dancers, though she has also exhibited her own productions at Dixon Place, Washington Square Park, and the Galápagos Islands.

Credits

Production career
By the 2010s, Stronach had co-founded a theatre company called Shoehorn Theater; in 2012, they began creating a new play, Light: A Dark Comedy ("a group generative effort where everyone is involved in every step of the creation.")

Steinbruner and Stronach created The Paper Canoe Company, an entertainment business that focused on "children's theatre, film, and education."  After the TV series Stranger Things used "The NeverEnding Story" and renewed interest in Stronach and the 1984 film, the couple began making their own 1980s-styled fantasy film.  Man & Witch stars Shohreh Aghdashloo, Sean Astin, Michael Emerson, Christopher Lloyd, Rhea Perlman, and Stronach's daughter, Maya.  , the film was in post-production.

References

Further reading

External links
 
 
 
 
 

1972 births
20th-century actresses
21st-century actresses
female dancers
film child actresses
living people
people of Israeli descent
people of Scottish descent
stage actresses